Najwa Zebian (born 27 April 1990) is a Lebanese–Canadian activist, author, poet, educator, and speaker based in London, Ontario. Zebian rose to fame on Instagram through sharing her instapoetry and gained popularity during the Me Too movement along with her subsequent TEDx talks and interviews on Canadian news outlets such as CBC, Entertainment Tonight, among others.

Her work draws from feelings of displacement and heartbreak and addresses themes of love, friendship, honesty, and identity. A revised edition of her 2016 self-published first collection, Mind Platter, came out with Andrews McMeel Publishing in 2018, followed by her second title, The Nectar of Pain. Zebian's third book, Sparks of Phoenix, was published in 2019 and recounts Zebian's journey in healing from abuse and rebuilding.

Early life and education 
Zebian was born in Lebanon and moved to Canada in 2006 at the age of sixteen due to 2006 Lebanon War. She currently lives in Ontario, Canada.

Zebian completed her Bachelor of Science in biology in 2010, a Bachelor of Education in General Science and Biology in 2012, and a Master of Education in Curriculum Studies in 2013, all at The University of Western Ontario. She is currently pursuing her Doctorate in Educational Leadership at the University of Western Ontario. Zebian's first teaching assignment at UWO was to teach writing to a group of young Libyan refugees. Zebian saw her 16-year-old self while teaching and found the courage to resume her writing journey.

Career 

Zebian self-published her first book in January 2016, a compilation of reflections called Mind Platter. She described it as a "compilation of reflections on life as seen through the eyes of an educator, student, and human who experienced her early days in silence." Upon its publication, it helped raise $2,300 where 100% of the profits for the first month was donated to the Syrian Refugee Fund in London. Zebian also distributed a percentage of the profits to summer activities run by the city for high school students. The revised and expanded version of the book was published in March 2018 by Andrews McMeel Publishing. Her work slowly gained public recognition on social media by celebrities such as Mathieu Kassovitz, Lisa Rinna, LeAnn Rimes, and Hilary Swank.

Her second book, The Nectar of Pain, was a collection of poetry and prose self-published in October 2016. Zebian wrote about feelings that emerged from a painful heartbreak. A revised and expanded version of the book was published in March 2018 with Andrews McMeel Publishing.

In 2017, Zebian took part in the forefront of the Me Too movement when she talked about the repercussions of coming forward with sexual harassment accusations (and a subsequent investigation) about an authority figure where she worked as a teacher. She wrote "I was blamed for it. I was told not to talk about it. I was told that it wasn’t that bad. I was told to get over it." and was referenced by the New York Times. Her poem went on to be featured in news stories about the Me Too movement from The Huffington Post, BBC News, CBS News, and Glamour.

Zebian faced another public incident when, as a Muslim woman, she decided to remove her hijab.

In March 2019, Zebian published her third book of poetry, titled Sparks of Phoenix with Andrews McMeel Publishing in which she recounts her journey in healing from abuse, building resilience and strength.

Published works 
 Mind Platter. Andrews McMeel Publishing, 2018.
 The Nectar of Pain. Andrews McMeel Publishing, 2018.
 Sparks of Phoenix. Andrews McMeel Publishing, 2019.
 "Welcome Home" Harmony Books, 2021.

See also
 Instapoetry

References 

1990 births
Instagram poets
Living people
Lebanese emigrants to Canada
21st-century Lebanese women writers
21st-century Canadian women writers